Sándor Simó (7 August 1934 – 4 September 2001) was a Hungarian film producer, director and screenwriter. He produced 25 films and directed a further seven. His 1969 film Those Who Wear Glasses won the Golden Leopard at the Locarno International Film Festival. His 1977 film My Father's Happy Years was entered into the 28th Berlin International Film Festival.

Selected filmography
 Those Who Wear Glasses (1969)
 My Father's Happy Years (1977)
  (1983)
 Whoops (1993)

References

External links

1934 births
2001 deaths
Hungarian film producers
Hungarian male film actors
Hungarian film directors
Male screenwriters
Hungarian male writers
Writers from Budapest
Male actors from Budapest
20th-century Hungarian screenwriters